Floridays is the fifteenth album by American popular music singer-songwriter Jimmy Buffett.  It was released in June 1986 as MCA 5730 and was produced by Coral Reefer Band member Michael Utley and recorded and mixed by Jay Rifkin.  The title of the album is taken from the 1941 poetry collection of the same name by Don Blanding. The album marks the end of Buffett's shift toward a more country sound that characterized his previous two releases and a return to a sound closer to that of his late 1970s and early 1980s output.  The album features a wider variety of musical instruments than was typical for Buffett's previous works, notably several songs with strings and horns.  His daughter Savannah Jane Buffett is credited for playing mini-conga on the album.
It was also his last studio album to feature Jimmy Buffett's trademark mustache, before he shaved it off for the next album Hot Water in 1988.

Songs
All of the album's songs were written or co-written by Buffett except for "If It All Falls Down" written by Coral Reefer Band member Matt Betton.  "I Love The Now" was co-written with actress and author Carrie Fisher.

The songs "First Look" and "When the Coast is Clear" later appeared on the box set Boats, Beaches, Bars & Ballads, and "Creola" appeared on Meet Me in Margaritaville: The Ultimate Collection. Buffett rearranged the song "Floridays" for the 2006 film Hoot, in which he co-starred.

Chart performance
Floridays reached No. 67 on the Billboard 200 album chart and No. 32 on the Billboard Top Country Albums chart.  None of the album's three singles charted.

Track listing
"I Love the Now" (Jimmy Buffett, Carrie Fisher) – 5:01
"Creola" (Jimmy Buffett, Ralph MacDonald, William Salter) – 5:39 (LP), 7:03 (CD)
"First Look" (Jimmy Buffett) – 3:59
"Meet Me in Memphis" (Jimmy Buffett, Michael Utley) – 4:46
"Nobody Speaks to the Captain No More" (Jimmy Buffett) – 5:07
"Floridays" (Jimmy Buffett) – 4:52
"If It All Falls Down" (Matt Betton) – 4:45
"No Plane on Sunday" (Jimmy Buffett, Michael Utley) – 4:16
"When the Coast Is Clear" (Jimmy Buffett, Mac McAnally) – 2:56
"You'll Never Work in Dis Bidness Again" (Jimmy Buffett, Michael Utley, Vince Melamed, Josh Leo, Willie Weeks, Matt Betton) – 3:10

Personnel
The Coral Reefer Band:
Jimmy Buffett – Acoustic guitar
Reggie Young – Electric guitar
Josh Leo – Electric and acoustic guitar
Willie Weeks – Bass
Michael Utley – Keyboards
Vince Melamed – Keyboards
Matt Betton – Drums
Sam Clayton – Congas
Robert Greenidge – Steel drums, timbales
Ralph MacDonald – Bongos, congas, tambourine and other percussion
Greg "Fingers" Taylor – Harmonica
Savannah Jane Buffett – Mini-conga
Josh Leo, Vince Melamed, Harry Stinson, Sam Clayton, Jimmy Buffett, Rita Coolidge, David Lasley, Cameron Grillo, Gene Van Buren, Phyllis Duncan, Deborah Hall, Helen Duncan Benard – background vocals

Singles
 “I Love the Now” b/w “No Plane on Sunday” (Released on MCA 52849 in 1986)
"Creola" b/w "You'll Never Work In Dis Bidness Again" (Released on MCA 52932 in September 1986)
 "Take It Back" b/w "Floridays" (Released on MCA 53035 in January 1987)

Tour
1986 brought yet another summer tour, this time to promote the Floridays album, with all the usual stops.

1986 Coral Reefer Band
Jimmy Buffett: Vocals and guitar
Josh Leo: Guitar (Summer Tour Dates)
Tim Krekel: Guitar (Fall Tour Dates)
George Porter: Bass (Summer Tour Dates)
Tim Drummond: Bass (Fall Tour Dates)
Matt Betton: Drums
Greg “Fingers” Taylor: Harmonica and background vocals
Michael Utley: Piano and organ (Summer Tour Dates)
Vince Melamed: Keyboards and organ (Fall Tour Dates)
Sam Clayton: Congas
Robert Greenidge: Steel Drums
Larry Lee: Percussion

Set list
The only set list from the tour that's been confirmed is that of the Convention Center Arena in Dallas, TX.  While the structure of Buffett's set lists generally remain the same in a given tour, the song selection varies from night to night; so it's more than likely that there were many changes to the set list as the tour progressed.

Convention Center Arena
Tuesday, August 12, 1986

"Coconut Telegraph"
"Ragtop Day"
"Grapefruit—Juicy Fruit"
"Boat Drinks"
"Meet Me in Memphis"
"Volcano"
"Havana Daydreamin'"
"If the Phone Doesn't Ring, It's Me"
"Why Don't We Get Drunk"
"Cheeseburger in Paradise"
"Creola"
"Fins"
"Changes in Latitudes, Changes in Attitudes" Intermission
"African Friend"
"If It All Falls Down"
"Pencil Thin Mustache" (solo acoustic)
"Son of a Son of a Sailor" (solo acoustic)
"Nobody Speaks to the Captain No More"
"Gypsies in the Palace"
"Come Monday"
"One Particular Harbour"
"A Pirate Looks at Forty"  Encore:
"Margaritaville"
"I Love the Now"  Encore 2:
"He Went to Paris" (solo acoustic)

Notes

Jimmy Buffett albums
1986 albums
MCA Records albums